Dawn Williams-Sewer (born 23 December 1973 in Portsmouth, Dominica) she is a retired athlete who competed for Dominica.

She competed at the 1996 Summer Olympic Games in the women's 800 metres, in the first round she finished 3rd and qualified for the semi-final, where she finished 5th and just missed out to a place in the final. Her result was overall in 10th place. This is as of 2016 the best performance by a Dominican athlete at the Olympics.

References

Living people
1973 births
Dominica female middle-distance runners
Commonwealth Games competitors for Dominica
Olympic athletes of Dominica
Athletes (track and field) at the 1994 Commonwealth Games
Athletes (track and field) at the 1996 Summer Olympics
People from Saint John Parish, Dominica